The Protection of Animals Act 1911 (c. 27) is an Act of the Parliament of the United Kingdom. It received royal assent on 18 August 1911.

The act consolidated several previous pieces of legislation, among others repealing the Cruelty to Animals Act 1849 and the Wild Animals in Captivity Protection Act 1900. It was itself largely repealed and replaced by the Animal Welfare Act 2006, which consolidated many different forms of animal welfare legislation.

See also
Wild Animals in Captivity Protection Act 1900
Animal welfare in the United Kingdom

External links

United Kingdom Acts of Parliament 1911
Animal welfare and rights legislation in the United Kingdom